is a Japanese former footballer.

Career statistics

Club

Notes

References

1989 births
Living people
Japanese footballers
Association football midfielders
Albirex Niigata Singapore FC players
Singapore Premier League players
Japanese expatriate sportspeople in Singapore
Expatriate footballers in Singapore